Claude de Kemoularia (March 30, 1922 – November 4, 2016) was a French citizen of Georgian descent whose career has been in the fields of banking and diplomacy.  He served as Dag Hammarskjöld's personal assistant from 1957 to 1961. In the mid-1960s, he was a special advisor to Prince Rainier of Monaco. From the late 1960s to 1982, he worked for Paribas. He returned to government with the Socialist administration of François Mitterrand in 1982. He served as France's permanent representative and ambassador to the United Nations in the 1980s.  He was also a guest on William F. Buckley's show "Firing Line", along with Benjamin Netanyahu on the topic of terrorism and what differences it has with revolutionary struggle.

References
Hume, Cameron (1994).  The United Nations, Iran, and Iraq. Bloomington: Indiana University Press.
Sciolino, Elaine (1985). "US Vetoes Resolution on Israel in UN." The New York Times. March 13.

French people of Georgian descent
1922 births
20th-century French diplomats
2016 deaths
Permanent Representatives of France to the United Nations